Emil Holtz (25 May 1873 in Pyritz – after 1931) was an early Nazi Party official who served as Gauleiter of Gau Brandenburg from 1928 to 1930.

Early years
The son of a Pomeranian farmer, Holtz was employed as a secondary school teacher. He became active in anti-Semitic circles before the turn of the twentieth century. After the First World War, he joined the German Socialist Party (DSP) in Berlin in 1920. This was a radically anti-Semitic, nationalist and völkische organization. In November of that year he became chairman of the DSP. Never a mass party, the DSP in March 1922 merged with the larger Nazi Party (NSDAP) with which it shared a common ideology. During the ban on the NSDAP imposed in the aftermath of the Beer Hall Putsch of November 1923, Holtz remained active as a speaker for the national socialist cause in Brandenburg.

Nazi Party career
Following the re-establishment of the Nazi Party, Holtz joined it on 29 July 1925 (membership number 11,751). Considerably older than most of the other leaders of the Nazi Party, Holtz did not share with them the experience of military service in World War I or participation in the Freikorps. However, he was named Second Deputy Gauleiter of Gau Berlin-Brandenburg in November 1926 by newly installed Gauleiter Joseph Goebbels. From March 1927, Holtz also was the Chairman of the Gau USCHLA committee, charged with investigating and adjudicating intra-Party conflicts and disputes. In May 1928, Holtz stood as a candidate for the Landtag of Prussia but was not elected.

Goebbels, meanwhile, had difficulty administering the Gau due to ongoing conflicts with the Sturmabteilung (SA), in particular Deputy Supreme SA-Führer-East Walter Stennes, and elements aligned with the more socialist, revolutionary wing of the Party. Consequently, on 1 October 1928, Gau Berlin-Brandenburg was divided into Gau Groß-Berlin and Gau Brandenburg, which comprised most of the Province of Brandenburg. While Goebbels maintained his position in Berlin, Holtz became the new Gauleiter of Brandenburg. As such, he was responsible directly to Adolf Hitler and effectively served as his viceroy to the Gau in all Party matters. Holtz would hold this position for nearly two years.

In 1929, Holtz was accused of sexual assault and was suspended from his teaching post. At the end of September 1930, Holtz resigned as Gauleiter, officially for health reasons, and also resigned from the Nazi Party on 30 September 1930. Facing criminal prosecution, he was forced to decline the mandate he had just won in the Reichstag election of 14 September 1930. After his trial in March 1931, he was sentenced to six months imprisonment. He never resumed his political career, and no additional details are known about his life.

References

Sources

1873 births
Gauleiters
Nazi Party officials
Nazi Party politicians
People from the Province of Pomerania
Year of death missing